The City of Williamstown was a local government area about  southwest of Melbourne, the state capital of Victoria, Australia.

History

Williamstown was first incorporated as a borough on 14 March 1856. It became a town on 2 April 1886, and was proclaimed a city on 17 May 1919. In May 1962, it annexed  from the Shire of Altona.

On 22 June 1994, the City of Williamstown was abolished, and along with the City of Altona and a couple of small neighbouring areas, was merged into the newly created City of Hobsons Bay.

Town Hall
Council meetings were held in a variety of locations in Williamstown until a permanent home was constructed. In its early years, the council met at the Police Court, as well as a rented property in Nelson Place, and later at the newly erected Court House. In 1869, the council took over the Town Hall in Thompson Street, finally moving to the purpose-built municipal building in Ferguson Street, known as Williamstown Town Hall, which was officially opened in 1927. The facility is still used for council meetings by the City of Hobsons Bay, although not as much as its Altona counterpart.

Electricity supply

Commencing in 1916, the municipality ran its own electricity supply utility for a number of years, the first customer being connected in July 1917. After six months in operation, it had around 400 customers, increasing to around 5,600 by 1934.

Wards

On 28 October 1887, the City of Williamstown was subdivided into four wards:
 South Ward
 North Ward
 Centre Ward
 Victoria Ward

At dissolution, each ward elected three councillors.

Suburbs
 Newport
 Spotswood (shared with the City of Footscray)
 Williamstown*
 Williamstown North

* Council seat.

Population

* Estimate in the 1958 Victorian Year Book.

References

External links
 Victorian Places - Williamstown City

Williamstown
1994 disestablishments in Australia
1856 establishments in Australia
City of Hobsons Bay
Williamstown, Victoria